Nelson Rodríguez (born June 12, 1994) is an American professional baseball first baseman for the York Revolution of the Atlantic League of Professional Baseball. He was drafted in the 15th round of the 2012 MLB draft by the Cleveland Indians.

Career

Cleveland Indians
Rodríguez attended George Washington High School in Washington Heights, Manhattan. The Cleveland Indians selected Rodríguez in the 15th round of the 2012 MLB draft. He started the 2013 season with the Lake County Captains of the Class A Midwest League, but struggled, and was demoted to the Mahoning Valley Scrappers of the Class A-Short Season New York-Penn League. He returned to Lake County in 2014. He began the 2015 season with the Lynchburg Hillcats of the Class A-Advanced Carolina League, and was promoted to the Akron RubberDucks of the Class AA Eastern League during the season. He played for Akron in 2016, earning a non-roster invitation to the Indians' 2017 spring training camp. Rodríguez was rated as the Indians #3 first base prospect entering the 2018 season. He became a free agent at the conclusion of the 2018 season. Rodríguez re-signed with the Indians in February 2019. He became a free agent following the 2019 season.

York Revolution
On March 17, 2020, Rodríguez signed with the York Revolution of the Atlantic League of Professional Baseball. He did not play a game for the team because of the cancellation of the ALPB season due to the COVID-19 pandemic and became a free agent after the year. On February 22, 2021, Rodríguez re-signed with the Revolution for the 2021 season. In 16 games with York, Rodríguez slashed .371/.467/.597 with 3 home runs and 18 RBI.

Toros de Tijuana
On July 4, 2021, Rodríguez signed with the Toros de Tijuana of the Mexican League. On July 11, Rodríguez was granted his release by Tijuana after going 4-for-20 in 6 games with the team.

York Revolution (second stint)
On July 16, 2021, Rodríguez re-signed with the York Revolution of the Atlantic League of Professional Baseball. Rodríguez was named the Revolution player of the year after batting .316 with 25 home runs and 81 RBI in 91 games with the team. He became a free agent following the season. 

On February 7, 2022, Rodríguez signed with the Revolution for the 2022 season. He played in 124 games for York, slashing .249/.414/.477 with 26 home runs and 82 RBI.

On February 7, 2023, Rodríguez re-signed with York for the 2023 season.

Personal life
Rodríguez's father, Nelson, was born in the Dominican Republic and played professional baseball, reaching Double-A with the Pittsburgh Pirates' organization.

References

External links

1994 births
Living people
Sportspeople from Manhattan
Baseball players from New York City
Baseball first basemen
George Washington Educational Campus alumni
Mahoning Valley Scrappers players
Lake County Captains players
Lynchburg Hillcats players
Akron RubberDucks players
Columbus Clippers players
York Revolution players